Better Living Through Chemistry is a 2014 American comedy-drama film directed and written by David Posamentier and Geoff Moore. The film stars Sam Rockwell, Olivia Wilde, Michelle Monaghan, Ben Schwartz, Ken Howard, Ray Liotta, and Jane Fonda. The film was released on March 14, 2014.

Plot
Doug Varney (Sam Rockwell), is unhappily married to Kara (Michelle Monaghan). They have a son Ethan who is acting weird. Kara isn't interested in anything but staying fit and cycling; she teaches spin classes and wins the town's cycle race every year. Straitlaced Doug is bullied by his retired father-in-law, whose small-town Pharmacy he took over.

Elizabeth (Olivia Wilde), is a bored trophy wife, prescription drug abuser and one of Doug's best clients. She seduces the unhappy Doug and they begin an  affair during which they both use Doug's businesses to abuse drugs. Doug's life is transformed by "better living through chemistry". Elizabeth persuades Doug to murder her husband Jack (Ray Liotta) so that they can run away together by tampering with the dosages of his heart medication. The plan fails when the delivery boy steals the medication and overdoses. Doug realizes that he can't abandon his son who needs him and straightens up. Elizabeth leaves Jack and heads overseas.

Cast 
 Sam Rockwell as Doug Varney
 Olivia Wilde as Elizabeth Roberts
 Michelle Monaghan as Kara Varney
 Ray Liotta as Jack Roberts
 Norbert Leo Butz as Agent Andrew Carp
 Ben Schwartz as Noah
 Ken Howard as Walter Bishop
 Jane Fonda as herself, a customer at Doug's pharmacy and the film's narrator

Production 
On February 25, 2010, The Hollywood Reporter reported that Posamentier and Moore would collaborate on their directorial debut, with their own screenplay of Better Living Through Chemistry, for Occupant Films. On January 7, 2014, Samuel Goldwyn Films has acquired all the United States distribution rights to the film for a spring 2014 release.

Casting 
In April 2010, Paul Rudd was expected to join the cast as a lead actor to play Douglas Varney. On September 15, 2010, Jennifer Garner and Jeremy Renner joined the cast to play the lead roles in the film, with Renner to play Douglas Varney and Garner to play Elizabeth Roberts. On February 11, 2011, Judi Dench and Michelle Monaghan joined the cast of the film.

Then, on July 15, 2011, Sam Rockwell continued negotiations with Occupant Films to replace Renner, who left the project due to a hectic filming schedule. In August 2011, Garner was pregnant and expecting her third child with Ben Affleck, resulting in the actress' departure from the project. Olivia Wilde replaced Garner and was cast opposite the confirmed Rockwell. Ray Liotta also joined the cast on March 27, 2012 to play the husband of Elizabeth Roberts. On May 16, 2012, Jane Fonda joined the cast of the film as Narrator, as well as a cameo as a customer of a pharmacy run by Douglas Varney.

Filming 
The filming of Better Living Through Chemistry began in May 2012 in Annapolis, Maryland. The duration of filming was five weeks and it occurred in different locations, including Baltimore, Anne Arundel County and Eastern Shore of Maryland. On May 10, 2012, the filming crew was shooting footage at Maryland State House.

Reception  
On Rotten Tomatoes the film has an approval rating of 22% based on reviews from 26 critics.

References

External links 
 

2014 directorial debut films
Films shot in Maryland
2014 comedy-drama films
American comedy-drama films
Entertainment One films
2010s English-language films
2010s American films